Rainish Eilean Mòr is an uninhabited island in Loch Orasaigh, north of the village of Leurbost in the area of South Lochs on the Isle of Lewis, Lewis and Harris.

The entirety of the loch has been an SSSI since 1983 and the island's perimeter and the neighbouring islet to the south west have woodland cover including the species of Rowan, Aspen, Downy Birch, Grey Willow and Sallow Willow. The underlying geology is Lewisian Gneiss overlain by peaty podzols and gleys.

The Gaelic name of the island means "large island of Rainish" and is taken from the surrounding area, which itself means "Roe deer headland", from Old Norse.

References
 Western Isles Native Woodland Restoration Survey Report. (pdf) (2008) Comhairle nan Eilean Siar/SNH. Stornoway. Retrieved 23 January 2010.

Notes

Freshwater islands of the Outer Hebrides
Isle of Lewis
Uninhabited islands of the Outer Hebrides